Tyrell Sales (born January 1, 1986) is an American football player who last played professionally in 2012 for the Parma Panthers, a team based in Parma, Italy that plays in the top level of the Italian Football League.

Sales was a linebacker for Penn State University. He was signed as a free agent by the AFL's Jacksonville Sharks in 2010. He also had a workout for the Indianapolis Colts, but did not make the team. He is a charter member of the Eta Alpha chapter of Iota Phi Theta fraternity.

External links
 Jacksonville Sharks Bio

1986 births
Living people
American football linebackers
Penn State Nittany Lions football players
Indianapolis Colts players
Montreal Alouettes players
Jacksonville Sharks players
People from Butler, Pennsylvania
Players of American football from Pennsylvania
American expatriate sportspeople in Italy
American expatriate players of American football